James Rossiter (born 25 August 1983) is a former professional racing driver, British motorsport executive and Team Principal of Maserati MSG Racing in Formula E.

He was a Test Driver for BAR, Honda, Super Aguri and Force India in Formula One and was due to drive for the proposed US F1 Team in the 2010 season. Before joining Maserati, Rossiter was the Sporting Director and Reserve Driver for DS Techeetah and raced for Peugeot Sport in the FIA World Endurance Championship.

Career

Karting 
Born in Oxford, England, Rossiter started his motor racing career in karting at the age of 14. Competing in TKM and Rotax Max karts, he stepped up to single-seater competition after only three years, testing a Formula Palmer Audi at the Bedford Autodrome in 2001.

Formula Renault and Formula 3 
Rossiter took the first steps in his professional career in 2002 by joining Falcon Motorsport to compete in the Formula Renault UK championship. Securing a best finish of fourth at Thruxton, he finished 13th in the Drivers’ Standings with 103 points but returned for the 2003 season, switching to Fortec Motorsport.

Hitting his competitive stride immediately, Rossiter finished third behind Mike Conway and Lewis Hamilton at the season opener at Snetterton and scored a further nine podiums, including one win, over the remainder of the season. He finished third overall behind Hamilton and Alex Lloyd and was recognised by a leading journalist as “the only driver to take the fight to Lewis Hamilton”.

In 2004, Rossiter continued his relationship with Fortec Motorsport but graduated to the British Formula 3 championship. He scored three victories and 12 podiums during the season to finish third in the Drivers’ Championship behind Nelson Piquet Jr. and Adam Carroll, while also receiving the Rookie of the Year Award.

With further performances at the Macau Grand Prix and Masters of Formula 3 events in 2004, Rossiter received the BRDC John Cooper Award and was selected as the winner of the BAR young F1 driver search from a group of upcoming racing drivers.

In 2005, Rossiter graduated to international competition, racing in the Formula 3 Euro Series for Signature-Plus. He finished the season in seventh in the Drivers’ Championship with one win and three podiums before switching to Formula Renault 3.5 for 2006, in which he was 14th.

Formula One 
After being selected as the winner of the BAR young F1 driver search in 2004, Rossiter continued to perform development work for the team throughout the 2005 season. He was retained for 2006 following Honda’s acquisition of the team and in 2007, worked primarily with the Super Aguri F1 team, spearheaded by Aguri Suzuki and Mark Preston.

In 2008, Rossiter was again retained by Honda as the team’s primary test and development driver for its Formula One program. Working in Japan, he played a key role in the development of the Honda RA109 which would become Jenson Button's World Championship-winning Brawn BGP 001 in 2009.

Following Honda’s withdrawal from Formula One, Rossiter focussed on securing a drive with one of four new teams entering the sport for the 2010 season. He was signed by the US F1 Team to partner José María López but was not officially confirmed prior to the team’s collapse.

Rossiter was instead poised to join the IndyCar Series, driving for KV Racing Technology after testing for the team at Barber Motorsports Park although the team re-signed Mario Morales, which left him without a drive. He subsequently joined Sky Sports as a commentator for their IndyCar coverage.

After three years away from Formula One, Rossiter returned in 2012 by joining Force India as a test and simulator driver. He drove the team’s 2013 car, the VJM06, at the first pre-season test at Jerez and was set to make his first practice appearance at the British Grand Prix to replace Adrian Sutil, although this was cancelled due to wet weather.

Super GT and Super Formula 

In 2013, Rossiter joined TOM'S to race full-time in the Super GT championship. As team-mate to ex-F1 driver Kazuki Nakajima, he won the second race of the season at Fuji and the penultimate race at Autopolis. He finished third in the standings, nine points behind champions Kohei Hirate and Yuji Tachikawa and also ran a part-time campaign in Super Formula, taking a best result of sixth.

Rossiter ran full-time in both Super GT and Super Formula in 2014 with TOM’S and Kondō Racing. He finished third in Super GT with a pair of wins at Suzuka and Buriam and took a best finish of second at Super Formula’s season opener and was sixth in the standings.

He continued his dual racing program throughout 2015 and 2016 and scored one win and four podiums with TOM’S in Super GT before racing solely in the series in 2017 after leaving Kondō Racing. He secured his final win in the series at Autopolis and finished fifth in the championship.

In 2018, Rossiter ran full-time in Super Formula with TOM’S and part-time in Super GT. He switched to Team Impul to race solely in Super GT in 2019 and scored his final podium at Okayama by finishing third.

World Endurance Championship 
Before joining the FIA World Endurance Championship, Rossiter took his first steps in sportscar racing in 2008 by competing part-time in the American Le Mans Series with Andretti Green Racing. He won alongside team-mate Franck Montagny at Belle Isle and later raced at the 2011 24 Hours of Le Mans with Jetalliance Racing, driving a Lotus Evora.

In 2012, he joined Lotus in the World Endurance Championship’s LMP2 class. He secured a best finish of ninth at Bahrain and started from pole position at Shanghai. He continued to drive for the team part-time in 2013 and 2014.

Rossiter rejoined the ByKolles operation in 2016 and ran part-time over the next three seasons, making six appearances in LMP1 alongside one LMP2 start for G-Drive Racing in 2017.

On 8 February 2021, Rossiter was named as the simulator and reserve driver for Peugeot Sport's return to the World Endurance Championship in the Hypercar class. He was later promoted to a full-time race seat following Kevin Magnussen's return to Formula One with Haas in 2022.

Rossiter finished fourth on the Peugeot 9X8's debut at Monza and finished fifth at Fuji. On 7 October 2022, Rossiter confirmed his departure from Peugeot and announced his retirement from professional competition to join Maserati MSG Racing in Formula E as Team Principal.

Formula E 
In 2017, Rossiter represented Venturi Racing at Formula E pre-season testing at the Circuit Ricardo Tormo in Valencia, Spain, alongside Edoardo Mortara, Maro Engel and Michael Benyahia.

DS Techeetah 
After missing out on a drive for the 2017-18 season, Rossiter reunited with former Super Aguri Technical Director, Mark Preston, to drive for DS Techeetah in Formula E’s first Rookie Test, at which he set the fifth-fastest time.

Rossiter was named as Techeetah’s Development Driver for the 2018-19 season and, working with DS Automobiles, played a key role in the development of the team’s championship-winning DS E-TENSE FE19 package. He returned to the cockpit for Formula E’s 2019 Rookie Test and set the second-fastest time behind Nico Müller.

Following Formula E’s fifth season, Rossiter became Techeetah’s Reserve Driver and was also appointed to the role of Sporting Director after the departure of predecessor Pedro de la Rosa. At the 2020 Marrakesh ePrix, Rossiter replaced full-time driver Jean-Éric Vergne for FP1, when the reigning champion was feeling unwell.

The team went on to win both the Drivers’ and Teams’ Championships in the 2019-20 season. Rossiter remained in the position of Reserve Driver and Sporting Director throughout the 2020/21 and 2021/22 campaigns before leaving the team.

Maserati MSG Racing 
On 7 October 2022, Rossiter joined Maserati MSG Racing as Team Principal following the departure of former team boss Jérôme d'Ambrosio and confirmed his retirement from professional driving.

Racing record

Career summary

Complete Formula 3 Euro Series results 
(key) (Races in bold indicate pole position) (Races in italics indicate fastest lap)

Complete Formula Renault 3.5 Series results 
(key) (Races in bold indicate pole position) (Races in italics indicate fastest lap)

Complete American Le Mans Series results

24 Hours of Le Mans results

Complete FIA World Endurance Championship results 
(key) (Races in bold indicate pole position; races in italics indicate fastest lap)

Complete Super GT results 
(key) (Races in bold indicate pole position; races in italics indicate fastest lap)

‡ Half points awarded as less than 75% of race distance was completed.

Complete Super Formula results 
(key) (Races in bold indicate pole position; races in italics indicate fastest lap)

References

External links 
 
 James Rossiter's news
 James Rossiter's profile

1983 births
Living people
English racing drivers
British Formula Renault 2.0 drivers
British Formula Three Championship drivers
Formula 3 Euro Series drivers
American Le Mans Series drivers
World Series Formula V8 3.5 drivers
European Le Mans Series drivers
24 Hours of Le Mans drivers
FIA World Endurance Championship drivers
Super Formula drivers
Super GT drivers
Fortec Motorsport drivers
Signature Team drivers
Pons Racing drivers
Andretti Autosport drivers
Kolles Racing drivers
TOM'S drivers
Kondō Racing drivers
G-Drive Racing drivers
Peugeot Sport drivers
TDS Racing drivers
Team LeMans drivers